Judo is an Universiade compulsory event  since 2007 in Bangkok, Thailand. Before this, judo was optional sport at 1967, 1985, 1995, 2001 and the 2003 editions.

Editions

Medal table 
Last updated after the 2019 Summer Universiade

Current events

Men 
 -60 kg
 -66 kg
 -73 kg
 -81 kg
 -90 kg
 -100 kg
 +100 kg
 Open
 Team

Women 
 -48 kg
 -52 kg
 -57 kg
 -63 kg
 -70 kg
 -78 kg
 +78 kg
 Open
 Team

References 
Sports123

 
Sports at the Summer Universiade
Universiade